Miguel López Abril (20 December 1954 – 11 April 2021) was a Spanish basketball player who played point guard for FC Barcelona Bàsquet from 1972 to 1979.

References

1954 births
2021 deaths
Baloncesto Málaga players
Bàsquet Manresa players
FC Barcelona Bàsquet players
Joventut Badalona players
Sportspeople from L'Hospitalet de Llobregat
Point guards
Saski Baskonia players
Spanish basketball coaches
Spanish men's basketball players